Brookula exquisita is a species of sea snail, a marine gastropod mollusk, unassigned in the superfamily Seguenzioidea.

Description
The height of the shell attains 1.8 mm.

Distribution
This marine species occurs off South Georgia.

References

exquisita